Limneria insculpta is a species of small sea snail, a marine gastropod mollusk in the family Velutinidae.

References

External links
 

Velutinidae
Gastropods described in 1913